Meter cake or meter-long cake (foreign names below) is a bicolor loaf-shaped cake made from yellow and brown sponge cake layered with buttercream or pudding and covered with a chocolate topping. It is baked in a baking tin in the shape of a "roe deer back" and served cut into slices.

The cake's name is often a hyperbole derived from its length, which is usually less than a meter, but ranks it among the longest baked cakes. A meter cake is traditionally served as a dessert during Christmas or Easter.

Names in other countries 
 Czech Republic and Slovakia: metrový koláč, metrová roláda (nickname: metrák), tunelový koláč
 Poland: metrowiec
 Hungary: méteres kalács

References 

Cakes
Slovak cuisine
Czech cuisine
Polish cuisine
 Hungarian cuisine